The Omega ratio is a risk-return performance measure of an investment asset, portfolio, or strategy. It was devised by Con Keating and William F. Shadwick in 2002 and is defined as the probability weighted ratio of gains versus losses for some threshold return target. The ratio is an alternative for the widely used Sharpe ratio and is based on information the Sharpe ratio discards.

Omega is calculated by creating a partition in the cumulative return distribution in order to create an area of losses and an area for gains relative to this threshold.

The ratio is calculated as:

A larger ratio indicates that the asset provides more gains relative to losses for some threshold  and so would be preferred by an investor. When  is set to zero the gain-loss-ratio by Bernardo and Ledoit arises as a special case.

Comparisons can be made with the commonly used Sharpe ratio which considers the ratio of return versus volatility. The Sharpe ratio considers only the first two moments of the return distribution whereas the Omega ratio, by construction, considers all moments.

Optimization of the Omega ratio 

The standard form of the Omega ratio is a non-convex function, but it is possible to optimize a transformed version using linear programming. To begin with, Kapsos et al. show that the Omega ratio of a portfolio is:If we are interested in maximizing the Omega ratio, then the relevant optimization problem to solve is:The objective function is still non-convex, so we have to make several more modifications. Then the discrete objective function becomes:With these substitutions, we have been able to transform the non-convex optimization problem into an instance of linear-fractional programming. Assuming that the feasible region is non-empty and bounded, it is possible to transform a linear-fractional program into a linear program. Conversion from a linear-fractional program to a linear program gives us the final form of the Omega ratio optimization problem:where  are the respective lower and upper bounds for the portfolio weights. To recover the portfolio weights, normalize the values of  so that their sum is equal to 1.

See also
Modern portfolio theory
Post-modern portfolio theory
Sharpe ratio
Sortino ratio
Upside potential ratio

References

External links
How good an investment is property? 

Financial ratios
Financial models
Financial risk modeling
Investment indicators
Linear programming